Vice-Admiral Sir Guy Bourchier Sayer KBE CB DSC (1903–1985) was a senior Royal Navy officer who commanded the Reserve Fleet.

Naval career
After leaving Highgate School Sayer joined the Royal Navy in 1916 during World War I. He also served in World War II on staff of the Commander-in-Chief, The Nore from 1940, as commanding officer of the destroyer HMS Ludlow from 1940 and on the naval staff at the Admiralty from 1943. He was also appointed commander of Naval Assault Force (A) for Operation Zipper, the invasion of Malaya, in 1945.

He became Vice Controller and Director of Naval Equipment at the Admiralty in 1953 and Flag Officer, Home Fleet Training Squadron in 1956. He was Flag Officer, Helicopter Group during Operation Musketeer, the assault on Port Said during the Suez crisis, in 1956. This group may have been part of Task Force 345. He became Admiral commanding the Reserve Fleet in 1958 before retiring in 1959, whereupon he was knighted.

After his retirement he spent much of his time until his death supporting his wife Sylvia in her conservation work aiming to keep the moorland of Dartmoor in Devon, England, free from anything that would spoil its natural beauty.

References

1903 births
1985 deaths
People educated at Highgate School
Royal Navy vice admirals
Knights Commander of the Order of the British Empire
Companions of the Order of the Bath
Recipients of the Distinguished Service Cross (United Kingdom)